Song Min-kyu may refer to:

 Song Min-kyu (footballer) (born 1999)
 Song Min-kyu (tennis) (born 1990)